Bolo Ta Ra Ra.. is the 1995 debut album of Punjabi-language Bhangra singer Daler Mehndi. The album remains the biggest selling non-film music Indian pop album. The album sold 20 million units, including more than a million in Kerala alone.

Track listing
Bolo Ta Ra Ra..	5:08
Soniye (O Meri Soniye)	5:54
Dil Mera Nal Nal Nal	4:40
Sun Baliye	5:26
Sajna Door Na Javeen	5:37
Ashke	6:42
Ta Na Na Na(Mirza)	3:56
Mennu Le Chal	4:44

Credits 
 Produced and composed by Jawahar Wattal
 Music arranged by Ravi Pawar
 Recorded Digitally at Adcamp, Delhi by S.C. Chawla
 Keyboards & Guitar: Edwyn A.J. Fernandes
 Rhythm by Babloo, Ramjoo
 Choreography: Kanchan Sachdev
 Music Video : Ken Ghosh

References

1995 debut albums
Daler Mehndi albums
Punjabi-language albums